Der Elsässer Bote ('The Alsatian Messenger') was a German-language daily newspaper in Alsace, France. Der Elsässer Bote was the organ of the pro-French Catholic party APNA, and was launched in 1928 with financial support from the French state. Dr. Haenggy served as the editor-in-chief of Der Elsässer Bote. As of 1930, Der Elsässer Bote had the largest circulation of all party-affiliated daily newspapers in Bas-Rhin, with a daily circulation of around 18,000. It ceased publication in 1940.

References

1928 establishments in France
1940 disestablishments in France
Defunct newspapers published in France
German-language newspapers published in Alsace-Lorraine
Publications established in 1928
Publications disestablished in 1940